Yaroslav III Yaroslavich (1230–1271) (Russian: Ярослав Ярославич) was the first Prince of Tver and the tenth Grand Prince of Vladimir from 1264 to 1271. Yaroslav and his son Mikhail Yaroslavich presided over Tver's transformation from a sleepy village into one of the greatest centres of power in medieval Russia. All the later dukes of Tver descended from Yaroslav Yaroslavich.

He was a son of Yaroslav II and younger brother of Alexander Nevsky. In 1247, while still a minor, he received from his uncle the town of Tver.

In 1252, Yaroslav and his brother Andrey seized Alexander's capital, Pereslavl-Zalessky. Reinforced by Tatar units, Alexander presently fought it back, taking prisoner Yaroslav's children and leaving his wife as a casualty on the field of battle. Yaroslav fled to Ladoga whence he was summoned by Novgorodians to succeed Alexander as their military commander. In 1258 he visited the khan's capital in Sarai, and two years later led the Novgorod army against the Teutonic Knights.

Upon Alexander's death in 1263, Yaroslav quarrelled with Andrey as to who should become Grand Duke next. They went to the Golden Horde for arbitration, which was in favour of Yaroslav. The latter, however, settled in Novgorod and married a daughter of one local boyar. Various Novgorodian factions still conspired against him and sought to place his brother Vasily of Kostroma or Alexander's son Dmitri of Pereslavl on the throne.

In 1270, the armies of three princes stood for a week near the town of Staraya Russa, ready for battle. The metropolitan, however, managed to reconcile them. Yaroslav, on surrendering Novgorod to his nephew, accompanied him to Sarai. He died on his way back to Tver on 9 September 1271 and was succeeded in Tver by his eldest son Svyatoslav and then by a more famous one, Mikhail Yaroslavich.

See also
Rulers of Russia family tree

Further reading
 Bibliography of the history of the Early Slavs and Rus'
 Bibliography of Russian history (1223–1613)
 List of Slavic studies journals

1230 births
1271 deaths
Grand Princes of Vladimir
Princes of Tver
Rurik dynasty
13th-century princes in Kievan Rus'
Eastern Orthodox monarchs